Maurice Perry Duncan (born July 18, 1931) is a former quarterback for the National Football League and Canadian Football League. He played for the San Francisco 49ers from 1954-1955, the BC Lions from 1956-1957, and the Calgary Stampeders in 1958.

Duncan played football at San Francisco State University.

References

 

1931 births
American football quarterbacks
Canadian football quarterbacks
American players of Canadian football
San Francisco 49ers players
BC Lions players
Calgary Stampeders players
Sportspeople from Berkeley, California
San Francisco State Gators football players
Living people
Players of American football from Berkeley, California